The Saguenay International Short Film Festival is an annual film festival in Saguenay, Quebec, Canada, which presents a program of short films. Presented since 1996, the event is one of the most important Canadian short film festivals.

References

Short film festivals in Canada
Film festivals in Quebec
Film festivals established in 1996
1996 establishments in Quebec
Saguenay, Quebec